The 2007–08 SK Telecom T Professional Basketball season was the 12th season of the Korean Basketball League.

Regular season

Playoffs

Prize money
Wonju Dongbu Promy: KRW 200,000,000 (champions + regular-season 1st place)
Seoul Samsung Thunders: KRW 80,000,000 (runners-up + regular-season 3rd place)
Jeonju KCC Egis: KRW 50,000,000 (regular-season 2nd place)

External links
Official KBL website (Korean & English)

2007–08
2007–08 in South Korean basketball
2007–08 in Asian basketball leagues